Sint-Pieters-Leeuw is a Dutch-speaking municipality of Belgium located in the province of Flemish Brabant (Flemish Region).

The municipality comprises the towns of Oudenaken, Ruisbroek, Sint-Laureins-Berchem, Sint-Pieters-Leeuw proper and Vlezenbeek. Sint-Pieters-Leeuw is located just outside the Brussels-Capital Region, in the Payottenland. The municipality is a blend of parks, castles, meadows and gardens with the Coloma park as its green heart.

On January 1, 2018, Sint-Pieters-Leeuw had a total population of 34,025. The total area is 40.38 km² which gives a population density of 842 inhabitants per km². It is a mostly a residential community with largely preserved rural areas and some industrial zones.

History

The municipality is one of the largest municipalities in Flemish Brabant. The rural settlement grew into a major residential and professional community. Sint-Pieters-Leeuw has a lengthy history behind it.

The oldest document dates back to the 9th century and is a deed of donation by 'dame Angela', a noblewoman from Brabant, in which reference is made to a 'domain' of seven miles in length and one mile in width with a parent church and 9 subsidiary churches', donated to the chapter of Saint Peter in Deutz, Cologne.

From 1236 onwards the domain belonged to the Land of Gaasbeek. In 1284 Henry I, Duke of Brabant and lord of Gaasbeek, granted a copy of the local penal code to the populace, which led the municipality to long remain the principal seat of a 'meierij' (Dutch for a district over which a mayor has jurisdiction) and a college of Aldermen.

In 1687 the fiefdom of Gaasbeek was publicly sold in various parts. By marriage or inheritance both the water castle of Coloma, currently the Municipal Cultural Centre, and the rights of the fiefdom as well as all manner of provisions (among others mills) became the possession of important nobles and courtiers such as Jan Karel Roose, member of the Great Council of Mechelen and Vital-Alex de Coloma, chamberlain of empress Maria-Theresia.

Since 1 January 1977 the former municipalities of Sint-Pieters-Leeuw, Oudenaken, Ruisbroek, Sint-Laureins-Berchem and Vlezenbeek have been joined to form a new administrative residential community.

Economy

Neuhaus, an international exporter of fine Belgian chocolate, is based in Sint-Pieters-Leeuw, as well as Lindemans Brewery, a brewery that produces lambics, a distinctly Belgian type of beer.

Other companies with a headquarters or main plant in Sint-Pieters-Leeuw include Belle-Vue Brewery, Mercedes-Benz Truck Center, Vanden Borre, Printer Systems (Avery Dennison), a Material Plant and Reinforcement Steel Plant of Besix and DATS 24 (a subsidiary of Colruyt).

Sights
Attractions include:
 Coloma park with Coloma castle 
 Rose garden and rose museum: besides the castle, the Coloma park has gained significant tourist attraction by the creation in 1995 of the Coloma Rose Garden. In the centre of Sint-Pieters-Leeuw bloom over 3,000 rose varieties from 25 different countries for a combined total of 300,000 flowers. Today it has become one of the most colourful natural areas in the Green Belt surrounding Brussels.
 The Sint-Pieters-Leeuw Tower, sometimes called the VRT-tower, is a 300 metre tall transmitter tower. Built in 1996, it is the tallest free standing structure in Belgium.
 Witse-tree, a tree known for being used in the popular crime drama, Witse.
 Castle of Klein-Bijgaarden, castle of the family Wittouck
 Domain Groenenberg - Gaasbeek, castle and park
 Zuunvallei, Natural landscape 
 Zobbroekvallei, Natural landscape
 Hof ten Brukom
 Hof ten Zellik
 Castle of Rattendaal
 Church of Our Lady
 Rats Castle
 Saint Peter's Church 
 Chapel of the Holy Cross 
 Chapel of Saint Magdalen 
 Chapel of Saint Roch

Famous inhabitants

 Johannes Malderus (1563–1633), bishop of Antwerp
 Jan van Ruusbroec (ca. 1293-1381), theologian and mystic  
 Jef Jurion (born 1937), football player
 Prof. Baron Roger Van Overstraeten (1937-1999), professor
 Paul Van Himst (1943), Belgian footballer and coach
 Thomas Foket (born 1994), football player
 Youri Tielemans (born 1997), football midfielder

Twin Cities 
 : Altenahr 
 : Someren

References

External links

Official website - in Dutch
Toerist info - in Dutch
News site - in Dutch
Info on nature reserves in Sint-Pieters-Leeuw- in Dutch

Municipalities of Flemish Brabant